Eponina is a genus of beetles in the family Cerambycidae, containing the following species:

 Eponina breyeri (Prosen, 1954)
 Eponina flava Lane, 1939
 Eponina lanuginosa (Martins & Galileo, 1985)
 Eponina metuia Martins & Galileo, 1998
 Eponina nigristernis (Martins & Galileo, 1985)

References

Aerenicini